The Hudson H9 was a semi-automatic pistol made by the now defunct Hudson Mfg. Unveiled at the 2017 SHOT Show in Las Vegas, Nevada after three years of development, the H9 brought multiple patented and patent pending features together in a new pistol design. Proven design elements included: an M1911 straight-pull trigger, a short-recoil operated system, and the heritage S&W 5900 series magazine tube. The new design elements were: forward barrel cams in front of the trigger-guard, the sear design marrying the straight pull trigger with a striker-fired system while remaining drop safe, the placement of the recoil spring, and the pairing of an insert chassis with a steel frame. These elements lent to its most noticeable difference—its appearance.

The  weight places the H9 within the same category as traditional aluminum frame handguns like the Beretta M9, Sig P226, and Sig P229. The H9 accomplished the lighter weight all steel construction through the insert and grip construction (traditionally called a frame) and the redistribution of the surface area of the pistol itself. Traditional all-steel pistols are usually heavier than their aluminum counterparts: the 1911, the 5906, and the CZ-75 SP-01.

In March 2019 Hudson Mfg declared bankruptcy leaving questions about the future of the H9.

Product variants
Hudson announced the H9A at the 2018 SHOT Show. This approach differs from traditional aluminum designs like the Sig 226, since Hudson used the same steel insert chassis in the H9A construction, meaning the slide rails and impact surfaces remain steel. The  weight brings the H9A into the same weight class as the HK VP9, the Archon Type B and 1911 lightweight defender variants.

Design history
In an interview, CEO Cy Hudson said the location of the recoil spring down in front of the trigger guard was designed to give the gun "...a high grip purchase—what most people call a low bore axis—that's really close to the slide. Your barrel is right above your grip, and the recoil impulse from that recoil spring is directed into the meat of your hand." This type of feature leads to less felt recoil and muzzle rise when shooting.

Company status
In August 2018, a lawsuit was filed against Hudson Mfg for breach of contract and failure to pay for parts.
In December 2018, the Facebook Hudson H9 Group carried many discussions regarding broken H9 pistols and their return to Hudson Mfg for repair work. Continued discussions through January 2019 reported that those H9s sent back to Hudson had still not been repaired or returned to their owners, and Cy Hudson stopped responding to those discussions or any others on the forum. Hudson Mfg. had reserved a booth at the 2019 SHOT Show, but as of 22 January 2019 their booth remained empty.  
As of January 28, 2019 the corporate phone number in Temple TX does not work. On March 14, 2019 Hudson Mfg. LLC filed for bankruptcy in Texas western bankruptcy court.

References

External links

 Official website Hudson H9 page

Semi-automatic pistols of the United States
9mm Parabellum semi-automatic pistols